USNS Carl Brashear (T-AKE-7) is a Lewis and Clark-class dry cargo ship of the United States Navy, named in honor of Master Chief Boatswain's Mate Carl Brashear (1931–2006), one of the first African-Americans to become a US Navy Master Diver, despite having lost a leg in the 1966 Palomares incident.

The contract to build Carl Brashear was awarded to General Dynamics's subsidiary National Steel and Shipbuilding Company (NASSCO) of San Diego, California, on January 11, 2005.  Her keel was laid down on November 2, 2007.  The completed ship was delivered to the Navy on March 4, 2009.

During Operation Tomodachi, Carl Brashear loaded more than 800 pallets of humanitarian cargo at Sasebo's Juliet pier on March 20 and set sail later that day to join the Navy ships operating off northern Japan. Brashear completed 17 underway replenishment missions, delivering more than 1 million gallons (3,800 m³) of fuel to ships supporting Tomodachi.

References

External links

 

Lewis and Clark-class dry cargo ships
Ships built in San Diego
2008 ships